This is a list of the works that have won both the Hugo Award and the Nebula Award, given annually to works of science fiction or fantasy literature. The Hugo Awards are voted on by science-fiction fans at the World Science Fiction Convention (Worldcon); the Nebula Awards—given by the Science Fiction and Fantasy Writers of America (SFWA)—began in 1966, making that the first year joint winners were possible.

The categories are defined by number of words, as follows:
Novel: >39,999 words
Novella: 17,500 - 39,999 words
Novelette: 7,500 - 17,499 words
Short story: <7,500 words
Hugo awards are denoted by the year the award is presented, while Nebulas are denoted by the year of publication.  This means that the years of the awards will be different for any given work.  Prior to 2009 there was an additional complication with works being eligible for the Nebula for more than a single calendar year.  For recent awards, only one date is shown below.

Novel
1966/1965 Novel: Dune by Frank Herbert  
1970/1969 Novel: The Left Hand of Darkness by Ursula K. Le Guin  
1971/1970 Novel: Ringworld by Larry Niven  
1973/1972 Novel: The Gods Themselves by Isaac Asimov  
1974/1973 Novel: Rendezvous with Rama by Arthur C. Clarke  
1975/1974 Novel: The Dispossessed by Ursula K. Le Guin  
1976/1975 Novel: The Forever War by Joe Haldeman  
1978/1977 Novel: Gateway by Frederik Pohl  
1979/1978 Novel: Dreamsnake by Vonda McIntyre  
1980/1979 Novel: The Fountains of Paradise by Arthur C. Clarke  
1984/1983 Novel: Startide Rising by David Brin  
1985/1984 Novel: Neuromancer by William Gibson  
1986/1985 Novel: Ender's Game by Orson Scott Card  
1987/1986 Novel: Speaker for the Dead by Orson Scott Card  
1993/1992 Novel: Doomsday Book by Connie Willis  
1999/1998 Novel: Forever Peace by Joe Haldeman 
2003/2002 Novel: American Gods by Neil Gaiman 
2005/2004 Novel: Paladin of Souls by Lois McMaster Bujold 
2008 Novel: The Yiddish Policemen's Union by Michael Chabon  
2010 Novel: The Windup Girl by Paolo Bacigalupi  
2011 Novel: Blackout/All Clear by Connie Willis 
2012 Novel: Among Others by Jo Walton 
2014 Novel: Ancillary Justice by Ann Leckie  
2018 Novel: The Stone Sky by N. K. Jemisin  
2019 Novel: The Calculating Stars, by Mary Robinette Kowal
2021 Novel: Network Effect, by Martha Wells

Novella
1971/1970 Novella: Ill Met in Lankhmar by Fritz Leiber
1976/1975 Novella: Home Is the Hangman by Roger Zelazny
1977/1976 Novella: Houston, Houston, Do You Read? by James Tiptree, Jr.
1978/1977 Novella: Stardance by Spider and Jeanne Robinson
1979/1978 Novella: The Persistence of Vision by John Varley
1980/1979 Novella: Enemy Mine by Barry B. Longyear
1982/1981 Novella: The Saturn Game by Poul Anderson
1985/1984 Novella: Press Enter by John Varley
1989/1988 Novella: The Last of the Winnebagos by Connie Willis
1990/1989 Novella: The Mountains of Mourning by Lois McMaster Bujold
1991/1990 Novella: The Hemingway Hoax by Joe Haldeman
1992/1991 Novella: Beggars in Spain by Nancy Kress
1995/1994 Novella: Seven Views of Olduvai Gorge by Mike Resnick
2002/2001 Novella: The Ultimate Earth by Jack Williamson
2003 Novella: Coraline by Neil Gaiman 
2012 Novella: The Man Who Bridged the Mist by Kij Johnson
2016 Novella: Binti by Nnedi Okorafor
2017 Novella: Every Heart a Doorway by Seanan McGuire
2018 Novella: All Systems Red by Martha Wells
2020 Novella: This Is How You Lose the Time War, by Amal El-Mohtar and Max Gladstone

Novelette
1968/1967 Novelette: "Gonna Roll the Bones" by Fritz Leiber
1973/1972 Novelette: "Goat Song" by Poul Anderson
1977/1976 Novelette: "The Bicentennial Man" by Isaac Asimov
1980/1979 Novelette: "Sandkings" by George R. R. Martin
1983/1982 Novelette: "Fire Watch" by Connie Willis
1984/1983 Novelette: "Blood Music" by Greg Bear
1985/1984 Novelette: "Bloodchild" by Octavia E. Butler
1989/1988 Novelette: "Schrödinger's Kitten" by George Alec Effinger
1994/1993 Novelette: "Georgia On My Mind" by Charles Sheffield
1995/1994 Novelette: "The Martian Child" by David Gerrold
2003/2002 Novelette: "Hell Is the Absence of God" by Ted Chiang
2006/2005 Novelette: "The Faery Handbag" by Kelly Link
2007/2006 Novelette: "Two Hearts" by Peter S. Beagle
2008 Novelette: "The Merchant and the Alchemist's Gate" by Ted Chiang
2021 Novelette: "Two Truths and a Lie" by Sarah Pinsker

Short Story
1966/1965 Short Fiction/Short Story: ""Repent, Harlequin!" Said the Ticktockman" by Harlan Ellison
1976/1975 Short Story: "Catch that Zeppelin!" by Fritz Leiber
1978/1977 Short Story: "Jeffty Is Five" by Harlan Ellison
1981/1980 Short Story: "Grotto of the Dancing Deer" by Clifford D. Simak
1987/1986 Short Story: "Tangents" by Greg Bear
1991/1990 Short Story: "Bears Discover Fire" by Terry Bisson
1993/1992 Short Story: "Even the Queen" by Connie Willis
2012 Short story: "The Paper Menagerie" by Ken Liu
2017 Short story: "Seasons of Glass and Iron" by Amal El-Mohtar
2018 Short story: "Welcome to your Authentic Indian Experience™" by Rebecca Roanhorse
2022 Short story: "Where Oaken Hearts Do Gather" by Sarah Pinsker

Dramatic Presentation, Long Form
1974/1975 Dramatic Presentation/Script: Sleeper by Woody Allen
1975/1976 Dramatic Presentation/Script: Young Frankenstein, written by Mel Brooks and Gene Wilder, directed by Brooks
1978/1978 Dramatic Presentation/Script: Star Wars by George Lucas
2000/2001 Dramatic Presentation/Script: Galaxy Quest by David Howard and Robert Gordon
2001/2002 Dramatic Presentation/Script: Crouching Tiger, Hidden Dragon by James Schamus, Kuo Jung Tsai and Hui-Ling Wang
2002/2003 Dramatic Presentation/Script: The Lord of the Rings: The Fellowship of the Ring, written and directed by Peter Jackson
2003/2004 Dramatic Presentation, Long Form/Script: The Lord of the Rings: The Two Towers, written and directed by Peter Jackson
2004/2005 Dramatic Presentation, Long Form/Script: The Lord of the Rings: The Return of the King, written and directed by Peter Jackson
2006/2006 Dramatic Presentation, Long Form/Script: Serenity, written and directed by Joss Whedon
2007/2008 Dramatic Presentation, Long Form/Script: Pan's Labyrinth, written and directed by Guillermo del Toro
2009/2009 Dramatic Presentation, Long Form/Script: WALL-E, written by Andrew Stanton and Jim Reardon, directed by Stanton, story by Stanton and Pete Docter
2011/2010 Dramatic Presentation, Long Form/Outstanding Dramatic Presentation: Inception, written and directed by Christopher Nolan
2014/2013 Dramatic Presentation, Long Form/Outstanding Dramatic Presentation: Gravity,  written by Alfonso Cuarón and Jonás Cuarón, directed by Alfonso Cuarón
2015/2014 Dramatic Presentation, Long Form/Outstanding Dramatic Presentation: Guardians of the Galaxy,  written by James Gunn and Nicole Perlman, directed by James Gunn
2017/2016 Dramatic Presentation, Long Form/Outstanding Dramatic Presentation: Arrival,  written by Eric Heisserer, directed by Denis Villeneuve, original story by Ted Chiang
2019/2018 Dramatic Presentation, Long Form/Outstanding Dramatic Presentation: Spider-Man: Into the Spider-Verse, written by Rodney Rothman, Phil Lord, directed by Bob Persichetti, Peter Ramsey and Rodney Rothman

Dramatic Presentation, Short Form
2012/2011 Dramatic Presentation, Short Form/Outstanding Dramatic Presentation: Doctor Who: "The Doctor's Wife" written by Neil Gaiman, directed by Richard Clark
2021 Dramatic Presentation, Short Form/Outstanding Dramatic Presentation: The Good Place: "Whenever You're Ready" written and directed by Michael Schur

Young Adult fiction
Note: The Lodestar Award is presented at the Hugo Award ceremony at the Worldcon, although it is not itself a Hugo Award.
2019 Lodestar Award/Andre Norton Award: Children of Blood and Bone by Tomi Adeyemi
2021 Lodestar Award/Andre Norton Award: A Wizard's Guide to Defensive Baking by Ursula Vernon (as T. Kingfisher)

Multiple Categories
1967/1966 Novelette/Novella: The Last Castle by Jack Vance
1972/1971 Novella/Novelette: The Queen of Air and Darkness by Poul Anderson
1970/1969 Short Story/Novelette: Time Considered as a Helix of Semi-Precious Stones by Samuel R. Delany
1971/1970 Short Story/Novelette: Slow Sculpture by Theodore Sturgeon
2021 Video Game/Game Writing: Hades

Note
In 1960, Daniel Keyes won a Hugo for his short story "Flowers for Algernon"; he then expanded it into a novel which won the Nebula for Best Novel in 1966.
In 2020, the TV series Good Omens, written by Neil Gaiman and directed by Douglas Mackinnon, won a Hugo for Best Dramatic Presentation, Long Form, while the episode "Hard Times" won a Nebula for Outstanding Dramatic Presentation.

Hugo and Nebula awards, joint winners